The 1913 Detroit Heralds season was the ninth season for the Detroit Heralds, an independent American football team. Led by coach Bill Marshall, the team compiled a 7–0 record, shut out seven opponents, and allowed only six points during the entire season. In addition to playing teams from within the State of Michigan, the 1913 Heralds also played and defeated teams from Canada (the Windsor Independents), Ohio (the Cleveland Tomahawks), and Illinois (Eckersall's Maroons from Chicago).

The Heralds' undefeated season in 1913 was followed by a second consecutive undefeated season in 1914, a winning streak that lasted 17 games.

Schedule

Players
The team's players included the following, those players with at least four starts shown in bold:

 Allen - started 3 games at end
 Cheney - started 1 game at tackle
 Fogel - started 3 games at tackle, 3 games at halfback
 Hoffman - started 1 game at guard
 Houck - started 1 game at fullback, started 1 game at guard, 1 game at tackle
 Jacobs - started 1 game at end
 Lingrel - started 3 games at guard, 3 games at end
 Birtie Maher - started 1 game at quarterback, 1 game at end
 Mauer - started 4 games at halfback, 1 game at fullback
 Moran - started all 7 games at center
 Lawrence Nadeau - started 1 game at halfback
 Neumann - started 1 game at guard
 Runkel - started 6 games at tackle, 1 game at halfback
 Schaeffer - started 3 games at halfback, 1 game at end
 Seubert - started 4 games at fullback, 2 games at halfback
 R. "Dick" Shields - started 5 games at end, 1 game at fullback; also served as a team captain
 G. Shields - started 3 games at guard, 2 games at tackle
 Watson - started 1 game at tackle
 Perce Wilson - started 6 games at quarterback
 Wayne - started 5 games at guard

References 

Detroit Heralds seasons
Detroit Heralds